Junior Rodrigues better known by his stage name WTFjuinin, is a film director, film producer and screenwriter of The Sims. He is best known for directing the film The Paranormal, which had its sequence in June 2014. He also made short films and is currently producing the remake of the book/film The Fault in Our Stars, A Culpa é do Destino.

Films
 The Paranormal - O Filme (2013)
 The Paranormal 2 - O Filme (2014)
 A Culpa é do Destino (2015)

Short films
 História da Vida (Família Turner) (2013)
 Especial Dia das Mães  (2014)
 A Despedida (2014)

Gameplays
 The Sims (2014)
 The Sims 4 (2014–present)

References

External links

Living people
Brazilian film directors
Horror film directors
Year of birth missing (living people)